Moneyval is the common and official name of the Committee of Experts on the Evaluation of Anti-Money Laundering Measures and the Financing of Terrorism. Moneyval is a monitoring body of the  Council of Europe, with 47 member states, reporting directly to its principal organ, the Committee of Ministers of the Council of Europe.

The task of Moneyval is assessing compliance with the principal international standards to counter money laundering and the financing of terrorism and the effectiveness of their implementation, as well as making recommendations to national authorities in respect of necessary improvements to their systems.

History
In 1997, the Council of Europe established the "Select Committee of Experts on the Evaluation
of Anti-Money Laundering Measures", carrying the official abbreviation of PC-R-EV, as a sub-committee of the European Committee on Crime Problems (CDPC, for Comité Européen pour les Problèmes Criminels). The functions of PC-R-EV were to be regulated by the general provisions of Resolution Res(2005)47 on committees and subordinate bodies.

In 2002, the name of the committee was changed to "Committee of Experts on the Evaluation of Anti-Money Laundering Measures and the Financing of Terrorism", with the abbreviation Moneyval, on the grounds that "the abbreviation 'PC-R-EV' does not express the aim of the committee’s activities sufficiently clearly." 

At their meeting of 13 October 2010, the Committee of Ministers adopted a resolution elevating Moneyval, from 1 January 2011, to an "independent monitoring mechanism within the Council of Europe, answerable directly to the Committee of Ministers".

See also
FATF, Financial Action Task Force on Money Laundering, also known as Groupe d'action financière (GAFI), an intergovernmental organization founded in 1989 on the initiative of the G7
GIABA, Inter-Governmental Action Group against Money Laundering in West Africa, an institution of the Economic Community of West African States
APG, Asia/Pacific Group on Money Laundering, also known as APGML
CDPC, European Committee on Crime Problems, Council of Europe 
Europol, European Union's law enforcement agency
List of acronyms associated with the Eurozone crisis

References

External links
Official website

Financial crime prevention
Tax evasion
Law enforcement in Europe
Funding of terrorism